Chrome steel is one of a class of non stainless steels such as AISI 52100, En31, SUJ2, 100Cr6, 100C6, DIN 5401 which are used for applications such as bearings, tools, drills and utensils.

Popular culture

The term was used in both the original 1933 version, as well as the 2005 remake, of King Kong. When Kong is brought to New York City, he is chained with this metal on stage. The impression given by the film from Carl Denham to the audience is that the "chrome steel" has some unique properties of having a higher tensile strength than "normal steel" which is incorrect. Higher tensile strength steels are created by the addition of carbon. True to this deceptive description, King Kong breaks free anyway (in both versions).

The term was also used in the Star Trek episode "A Private Little War," where the guns introduced to the primitive villagers by the Klingons were fashioned with a chrome steel drill point.

Billy Joel used the term "chromium steel" in his song "Allentown" from "The Nylon Curtain" album (1982).

Steels